Shui-Ling "Lily" Yip is a Chinese-born American table tennis player and coach.

Yip began playing table tennis in Guangzhou at the age of 7 and went on to become a member of the Guangdong provincial team at age 15. She moved to the US in 1987 and obtained American citizenship in 1991. She studied computer science at Middlesex County College.

She competed in women's singles and doubles at the 1992 and 1996 Olympics.
Between 1991 and 2003, Yip participated in three Pan American Games, winning two gold and four silver medals. She also played in nine World Championships and three World Team Cups.

At the US National Championships, Yip was the runner-up in women's singles four times and won the women's doubles title four consecutive times (1992-1995). In 2005, Yip and her son Adam Hugh became national champions in mixed doubles. In 2006, Yip and her daughter Judy Hugh won the women's doubles title at the US Open.

In 2004, Yip was inducted into the USA Table Tennis Hall of Fame. She was named USATT National Coach of the Year in 2004, 2010 and 2013.
Yip resides in Warren Township, New Jersey and is the director of the Lily Yip Table Tennis Center in Dunellen, New Jersey, one of 7 "National Centers of Excellence" recognized by USA Table Tennis.

External links 

 Lily Yip Table Tennis Center

References 

1963 births
Living people
American female table tennis players
Olympic table tennis players of the United States
Table tennis players at the 1992 Summer Olympics
Table tennis players at the 1996 Summer Olympics
Pan American Games gold medalists for the United States
Pan American Games silver medalists for the United States
Pan American Games medalists in table tennis
Naturalised table tennis players
Table tennis players from Guangzhou
People from Warren Township, New Jersey
Middlesex County College alumni
Table tennis players at the 1991 Pan American Games
Table tennis players at the 1995 Pan American Games
Table tennis players at the 2003 Pan American Games
Medalists at the 1991 Pan American Games
Medalists at the 1995 Pan American Games
Medalists at the 2003 Pan American Games
21st-century American women